Ang Paboritong Libro ni Hudas (The Favorite Book of Judas) or The Black Book is a 2003 semi-biography book by Filipino author Bob Ong. It was his third published work and the first book where he first introduces fiction to his readers.

Chapter
Each chapter title is an anagram of the 7 deadly/capital sins:

Each chapter tells a story, the theme of which is the deadly sin corresponding to its title.

The book is also divided into two different types—first is fiction; the conversation scenes between the man who committed suicide and the other one, that he didn't recognize if it is God he was talking to, or if it is just Lucifer tricking him. The other one is nonfiction, in which the narration of the author's point of view.

2003 books
Books by Bob Ong